The Institute for Diversification and Saving of Energy (IDAE) is an agency of the Ministry of Industry, Energy and Tourism through the Ministry of Energy. The Secretary of State for Energy, Mr. Alberto Nadal Belda, is the president of IDAE.

Contribute to achieving the objectives of Spain in improving energy efficiency, renewable energy and other low carbon technologies is the strategic framework of its activity.

In this sense, the IDAE conducts communication campaigns, dissemination and training, technical assistance, program development and funding of specific projects of technological innovation and replicable nature. Also, the Institute leads an intense international activity under various European programs and cooperation with third countries worldwide.

Objectives
-Promote the use of new technologies of replacement and savings in industry, agriculture, services, homes, buildings and transport areas.

-Manage and track savings plans and national energy efficiency.

-Promote the rational and efficient use of energy, both in the business and the household environment.

-Collaborate with the European Commission in the management of energy programs and support the Spanish companies in obtaining funding to implement these programs, as well as providing support to Spanish companies in international markets, especially in renewable energy.

-Offer integrated energy efficiency sectors that require a catalyst for implementation.

Organization

General Manager- Mr. Arturo Fernández Rodríguez

General Secretary - Mr. Arturo Fernández Rodríguez

Departments: Planning and Studies, International Relations, Legal, Coordination, Information Technology and Human Resources

Efficiency Savings Manager - Mr. Pedro Antonio Prieto Gonzalez. Departments: Coordination and Support, Domestic & Buildings, Transports, Public Services and Agriculture, Industry, Energy Transformation.

Economic Manager - Mr. Antonio Carbonell Lampérez. Departments: Procurement, Purchasing and Services, Budget and Financial Management and Accounting.

Renewable Energy Manager - Mr. Alfonso Olivas la Llana. Departments: Coordination and Support, Hydroelectric, Geothermal, Wind, Solar, Biomass and Waste, Biofuels.

See also

 Comisión Nacional de Energía
 Electric vehicle
 Ministry of Industry (Spain)
 Net metering
 Renewable energy in Spain
 Renewable energy in the European Union

References

External links
 IDAE
 IDAE: Fuel consumption and CO2 emissions from new passenger cars and cars more efficient.
 Renewable Energy Plan.
 2008-2012 Action Plan of the Strategy for Energy Saving and Efficiency in Spain (E4)
 International Technical Conference on "Production and use of microalgae for energy purposes of IDEA 

Electric vehicles
 Plan Movele

Renewable energy in Spain
Public services of Spain